Abacetus crebrepunctatus is a species of ground beetle in the subfamily Pterostichinae. It was described by Straneo in 1975.

References

crebrepunctatus
Beetles described in 1975